Hamid Majd Teymouri is a retired Iranian football player.

Club career
He played for Shahbaz F.C./Shahin F.C. many years winning the Tehran Cup in 1981.

International career
He played for the Iran national football team in one game (to Yugoslavia in April 1978) and participated at the 1978 FIFA World Cup as a member of the squad.

References

1953 births
Living people
Iranian footballers
1978 FIFA World Cup players
Iran international footballers
Association football forwards